Sanza Pombo is a town and a municipality in Uíge Province in Angola. The municipality had a population of 68,391 in 2014.

Infrastructure 
Sanza Pombo is served by Sanza Pombo Airport which is 7.5 kilometres (4.7 mi) northwest of the town.

References

Populated places in Uíge Province
Municipalities of Angola